William Martin (1829–1900) was a British architect who worked in Birmingham, England, particularly in the practice Martin & Chamberlain.

Born in Somerset in 1829 he joined a Birmingham architect called Thomson Plevins, and then became a partner of D. R. Hill, public works architect of early 19th century Birmingham. In 1864 J. H. Chamberlain joined the practice, succeeding Hill.

Martin & Chamberlain were architects to the Birmingham School Board and designed the majority of the new board schools created by the Elementary Education Act 1870, with Chamberlain doing much of the actual design work, as well as many other public buildings such as police stations, baths, and libraries. They were surveyors to the new Corporation Street from 1878. The trading name of Martin & Chamberlain continued after Chamberlain's death in 1883, and many buildings attributed to the partnership were, in fact, Martin's.

He later brought his sons, Frederick and Herbert Martin, into partnership, and traded under the name Martin & Martin.

Martin was followed as architect to the School Board by H. T. Buckland.

Works
forty one board schools
extension to Birmingham General Hospital, Summer Lane, 1857
St David's Church, Bissel Street, Highgate, Birmingham 1860
Northwood Street public baths, 1862
Central Library, 1864 (destroyed by fire, 1879)
Spring Hill Library
Completed Birmingham School of Art after the death of its designer, J. H. Chamberlain
St John's Church, Sparkhill, 1888, church with unusually large central space
Harborne Tenants Moor Pool garden suburb housing estate centred on The Circle in Harborne, founded by John Sutton Nettlefold 1907, including, North gate, High Brow, Margaret Grove
Grand Hotel, mainly interior works including the Grosvenor Suites, 1894–95

See also
Martin & Chamberlain

Sources

Birmingham Buildings, The Architectural Story of a Midland City, Bryan Little, 1971, 
Pevsner Architectural Guides - Birmingham, Andy Foster, 2005, 

19th-century English architects
1829 births
1900 deaths
Architects from Birmingham, West Midlands